Crézancy-en-Sancerre is a commune in the Cher department in the Centre-Val de Loire region of France.

Geography
The commune is one of only a few that grow grapes for Sancerre AOC wines.

Population

Sights
 The church of St. Pierre, dating from the twelfth century.
 The feudal motte in Chaume woods.
 Medieval manorhouses at Reugny, Champtin and Vauvredon.
 A windmill.

See also
Communes of the Cher department

References

External links

Website about Crezancy 

Communes of Cher (department)